Robinsonia evanida is a moth in the family Erebidae. It was described by William Schaus in 1905. It is found on Cuba.

References

Moths described in 1905
Robinsonia (moth)
Endemic fauna of Cuba